Hadronomas is a genus of kangaroo in the subfamily Sthenurinae. There is only one described species, Hadronomas puckridgi, known from various fossil material from the Alcoota Fauna site, and an undescribed species from Lake Kanunka.

References

Gavin Prideaux, "Systematics and Evolution of the Sthenurine Kangaroos" (April 1, 2004). UC Publications in Geological Sciences. Paper vol_146. http://repositories.cdlib.org/ucpress/ucpgs/vol_146

External links

Prehistoric macropods
Prehistoric mammals of Australia
Pleistocene marsupials
Prehistoric marsupial genera
Taxa named by Richard Owen
Fossil taxa described in 1873